The 1994 Thomas & Uber Cup was the 18th tournament of the Thomas Cup, and the 15th tournament of the Uber Cup, which are the major international team competitions in world badminton.

Thomas Cup

Teams
51 teams took part in the competition, and eight teams qualified for the Final Stage, including Malaysia, as defending champion, and Indonesia, as host team.

Final stage

Group A

Group B

Knockout stage

Semi-final

Final
Like as 1967 competition stopped by Scheele, but Malaysian team can't resume the two match more, Tan Kim Her/Yap Kim Hock against Ricky Subagja/Rexy Mainaky and Hermawan Susanto against Foo Kok Keong. The Indonesian crowd was getting too noisy and distracting, that the Malaysian players could not continue. The IBF official stopped the following two matches.

Uber Cup

Teams
44 teams took part in the competition, and eight teams qualified for the Final Stage.

Final stage

Group A

Group B

Knockout stage

Semi-final

Final

References
Smash: 1994 Thomas Cup - Final Round
Smash: 1994 Uber Cup - Final Round

Thomas & Uber Cup
Thomas Uber Cup
Thomas Uber Cup
Badminton tournaments in Indonesia